Hunnic may refer to:

 Huns, a former nomadic tribe of the Eurasian steppe
 Hunnic language, spoken by the Huns
 Hunnic grapes, a class of grapes grown in German-speaking countries during the Middle Ages

See also
 Hun (disambiguation)
 Hunno, Alamannic king in 385